The Kliau, Keliau or Klau is a traditional shield of the Dayak people of Borneo. It is similar to the shields used by other Dayak people such as the Klebit Bok of the Kenyah. Other names for this shield include: klawang or kelawang and trabai or terabai.

Description
The Kliau is a shield in a shape of a hexagon and made from wood or from bamboo.

See also

Kurabit
Baluse
Klebit Bok

References 

Shields
Weapons of Indonesia
Weapons of Malaysia